Phil Conway (born 24 January 1948) is an Irish athlete. He competed in the men's shot put at the 1972 Summer Olympics.

For many years Conway was PE teacher, athletics coach and head of sport at Belvedere College, Dublin.

In his career Conway won five Irish national titles in the discus, four in the Shot Put and one in the Hammer.

References

1948 births
Living people
Athletes (track and field) at the 1972 Summer Olympics
Irish male shot putters
Olympic athletes of Ireland
Place of birth missing (living people)
Faculty of Belvedere College